USS N-1 (SS-53) was a N-class coastal defense submarine built for the United States Navy during World War I.

Description
The N-class boats designed by Electric Boat (N-1 throughN-3) were built to slightly different specifications from the other N-class submarines, which were designed by Lake Torpedo Boat, and are sometimes considered a separate class. They displaced  on the surface and  submerged. The N-class submarines had a crew of 2 officers and 23 enlisted men.

For surface running, the Electric Boat submarines were powered by two  diesel engines, each driving one propeller shaft. When submerged each propeller was driven by a  electric motor. They could reach  on the surface and  underwater.

The boats were armed with four 18-inch (450 mm)  torpedo tubes in the bow. They carried four reloads, for a total of eight torpedoes.

Construction and career
N-1 was laid down on 26 July 1915 by Seattle Construction and Drydock Company in Seattle, Washington. She was launched on 30 December 1916 sponsored by Mrs. Guy E. Davis, and commissioned on 26 September 1917 with Lieutenant George A. Trever in command. Reassigned to the East Coast, she departed San Francisco on 13 December for Balboa, Panama Canal Zone, and thence proceeded via Cristobal, Jamaica, Key West, Florida, and Norfolk, Virginia, to New London, Connecticut, arriving on 7 February 1918.

Reporting for duty to Commander, First Naval District, the submarine began her first patrol on 23 June by hunting for a U-boat reported in the vicinity of Cape Cod. After an intensive but fruitless search, N-1 continued her patrol off the New England coast. For the remainder of the war and until early 1922, N-1 continued her operations in the area from New London to Bar Harbor.

Placed in reduced commission on 1 May 1922, N-1 became a training submarine for the Submarine School, New London.  She continued this duty until ordered to Philadelphia Navy Yard on 9 December 1925. Arriving at Philadelphia, Pennsylvania, on 18 December, she was decommissioned on 30 April 1926. Struck from the Naval Vessel Register on 18 December 1930, N-1 was scrapped in early 1931.

Notes

References

External links
 

United States N-class submarines
World War I submarines of the United States
Ships built in Seattle
1916 ships